The Carrick-on-Suir William Loughman Forestry Rally, William Loughman Memorial Forestry Rally is an annual motorsport forest rallying event held in Tipperary, Ireland. Promoted and organised by Carrick-on-Suir Motor Club, Wm. Loughman Forestry Rally is long-standing opening round of the Irish Forest Rally Championship.

It was also a stage in South East Stages Rally Championship in 2002 and 2006. It is back on the calendar since 2019.

History 
Starting in 1985 as Carrick-on-Suir Forest Rally, the Willie Loughman Memorial Forestry Rally is Ireland's longest running forestry rally. The event ran every year with exception of 2001 due to the outbreak of foot-and-mouth disease.

In the early years the rally would start at midnight at the forestry gate, follow the route arrows, and finish the stage at the forestry exit gate. The arrow signs were made from tin by Willie Loughman, to whose name the forestry rally is now dedicated.

2020 

The 2020 event was the opening round for the Irish Forest Rally Championship and the South East States Rally Championship. Directed by the Clerk of the Course Liam Mackey, the event consisted of 59.44 stage kilometers and 144.12 road kilometers divided into 6 stages. This year's entry fee was €700. The rally went ahead despite heavy winds and rain caused by Storm Dennis. Out of 70 starters, 48 have reached the finish line. James Wilson, 2018 Billy Coleman Award winner, led the rally from start to finish.

Roll of Honor 

* as of 2020

External links
 Web page by the organizing Motor Club

References

Annual events in Ireland
Rally competitions in Ireland
Motorsport in Ireland
Motorsport competitions in Ireland